Anthony Hungerford may refer to:

Sir Anthony Hungerford of Down Ampney (bapt. 1492–1558), MP for Gloucestershire
Sir Anthony Hungerford of Black Bourton (1564–1627), religious controversialist, father of the Royalist
Anthony Hungerford (Royalist) of Black Bourton (1607/8–1657), Member of Parliament and Royalist
Anthony Hungerford (Roundhead) (1614/15?–1657), officer of Parliamentary forces during the English Civil War